Kazimierz Julian Kaczor (born February 9, 1941) is a Polish actor and television presenter. He has made over 40 appearances in film and television. He starred in the 1986-1987 television series Zmiennicy but is well known for hosting the Polish version of Jeopardy!.

Selected filmography
 Nights and Days (Noce i Dnie) (1975)
 Układ zamknięty (2013)
 Krzyzacy (1967)
 Polskie drogi (1990)
 Jan Serce (1985)
 Czterdziestolatek (1977)
 Alternatywy 4 (1986)
 Piotrus Pan (2005)
 Blindness (2016)

References

External links
 

1941 births
Male actors from Kraków
Living people
Polish male film actors
Polish male television actors
Polish television presenters
Officers of the Order of Polonia Restituta
Recipients of the Silver Cross of Merit (Poland)
Recipients of the Silver Medal for Merit to Culture – Gloria Artis